Taju-ye Sofla (also Romanized as Tājū-ye Soflá; also known as Tajusofla) is a village in Zagheh Rural District, Zagheh District, Khorramabad County, Lorestan Province, Iran. At the 2006 census, its population was 83, in 14 families.

References 

Towns and villages in Khorramabad County